Roundabout is an acoustic instrumental album by the guitarist Phil Keaggy, released in July 2006. The songs were compiled from sound check loops of guitar improvisations recorded before his concerts.

Track listing
 "Skippin' Stones"
 "Blue Moon"
 "Is It Going"
 "Cayenne Loop"
 "2nd Avenue"
 "South of the Boredom"
 "Happy Feet"
 "J-Loop"
 "Loop Frog"
 "Cousin Nit"
 "Loop a Loola"
 "Steel Engine"
 "Troops"
 "Helix the Cat"
 "Hoopy"
 "Zooloop"
 "Last Mile"
 "Merry Go Round"

Personnel
Produced, edited and mixed by Phil Keaggy
Recorded by Brian Persall except track 3 recorded by Phil Keaggy
Mastered by Anthony "Ziggy" Johnson

References

Phil Keaggy albums
2006 live albums